Elachista vulcana is a moth of the family Elachistidae. It is found in Spain and Morocco.

The wingspan is 12-12.5 mm for males and 14 mm for females. The forewing ground colour is unicolorous yellowish white with concolorous fringe scales. The basal third of the costa is narrowly grey. The hindwings are grey above, with paler yellowish grey fringe scales. The underside of both wings is dark grey, with yellowish white fringe scales.

References

vulcana
Moths described in 2011
Moths of Europe
Moths of Africa